Jokebook is an American adult animated comedy series produced by Hanna-Barbera. It aired on NBC for three episodes from April 23 to May 7, 1982.

Format
The series' theme song was sung by Scatman Crothers.

Jokebook was an anthology of segments produced by Hanna-Barbera, along with classic, foreign, and independent animation which had originated elsewhere. Unusually for a Hanna-Barbera production, it was aimed at an adult audience (the first Hanna-Barbera production to be so after The Flintstones and Top Cat started being shown on Saturday mornings). It was the only Hanna-Barbera production not to have recurring characters. The show was aired with a laugh track and was the last Hanna-Barbera series to do so.

Seven episodes were made, but only three were aired due to lack of audience interest. The show's second episode finished dead last in the week's ratings.

References

External links
 

1980s American adult animated television series
1980s American animated comedy television series
1980s American anthology television series
1982 American television series debuts
1982 American television series endings
American adult animation anthology series
American adult animated comedy television series
English-language television shows
NBC original programming
Television series by Hanna-Barbera